Karen Lorraine Jacqueline Speier (born May 14, 1950) is an American lawyer and politician who served as the U.S. representative for , serving in Congress from 2008 to 2023. A member of the Democratic Party, Speier represented much of the territory that her political mentor, Leo Ryan, represented. 

In 1978, while working as his aide, Speier survived five gunshot wounds when Ryan was assassinated during the Jonestown massacre. Speier was a member of the California State Senate, representing parts of San Francisco and San Mateo counties. On April 8, 2008, she won the special election for the vacated United States House of Representatives seat of the late Congressman Tom Lantos. In 2021, she announced that she would not seek reelection in the 2022 midterm elections.

Early life and education
Speier was born in 1950 in San Francisco, and grew up in an apolitical family, the daughter of Nancy (née Kanchelian) and Manfred "Fred" Speier. Her mother, who was born in Fresno of Armenian descent, lost most of her extended family in the Armenian genocide, while her father was an immigrant from Germany. He was the son of a Jewish father and a Catholic mother. Speier took Jacqueline as her confirmation name after Jackie Kennedy. She is a graduate of Mercy High School in Burlingame. She earned a Bachelor of Arts from the University of California, Davis, and a Juris Doctor from the University of California, Hastings College of the Law in 1976.

Marriage and family
Speier's first marriage was to Steven Sierra, an emergency-room doctor, in 1987. In 1988, they had a son, Jackson Kent, while she was a member of the California State Assembly. Sierra died in a car crash in 1994 at age 53. At the time, Speier was two months pregnant with their second child, a daughter she named Stephanie.

In 2001, Speier married Barry Dennis, an investment consultant.

Jonestown shooting

Speier entered politics by serving as a congressional staffer for Congressman Leo Ryan. Speier was part of his November 1978 fact-finding mission organized to investigate allegations of human rights abuses by Jim Jones and his Peoples Temple followers, almost all of whom were American citizens who had moved to Jonestown, Guyana, with Jones in 1977 and 1978. 

Several Peoples Temple members ambushed the investigative team and others boarding the plane to leave Jonestown on November 18. Five people were killed, including Ryan. While trying to shield herself from rifle and shotgun fire behind small airplane wheels with other team members, Speier was shot five times and waited 22 hours before help arrived. The same day, over 900 remaining members of the Peoples Temple died in Jonestown and Georgetown in a mass murder-suicide.

Political career

San Mateo County
Speier's political career began with an unsuccessful run to fill the vacancy caused by Ryan's death (the seat she holds now). She lost the Democratic primary to another former Ryan staffer, G. W. "Joe" Holsinger. He lost the special election to the Republican nominee, San Mateo County Supervisor Bill Royer, who served the remaining 21 months of the term before losing to Tom Lantos.

Speier won her first election in 1980, when she ran for the San Mateo County Board of Supervisors and defeated a 20-year incumbent. At the time, she was the youngest person ever elected to the board. She was reelected in 1984, and was later selected as chairwoman.

California State Assembly
In 1986, midway through her second term on the Board of Supervisors, Speier ran for the California State Assembly from a district in northern San Mateo County. She won by a few hundred votes. She was reelected four more times, the last time as the nominee of both the Democratic and Republican parties.

California State Senate
State law prevented Speier from running for reelection to the Assembly in 1996, but in 1998 she was elected to the California State Senate. In 2002, she was elected to a second term with 78.2% of the vote. As a state senator, Speier was instrumental in securing $127 million to start the "Baby Bullet" express service for Caltrain, for which the commuter rail agency named a new locomotive (no. 925) after her. Speier also focused on representing consumer rights. She was termed out of the California State Senate in 2006. During her last term, she served as assistant president pro tempore of the State Senate.

Candidate for lieutenant governor of California
In 2006, Speier ran in the Democratic primary for lieutenant governor of California against insurance commissioner John Garamendi and state senator Liz Figueroa. In the June 6 election, Garamendi defeated Speier with 42.5% of the vote. Speier received 39.7% and Figueroa the remaining 17.8%.

U.S. House of Representatives

Tenure 

On January 13, 2008, Speier announced she was running in the Democratic primary for the 12th District, Ryan's old district. The seat was being vacated by 14-term incumbent Tom Lantos, who announced on January 2, 2008, that he was not seeking reelection. Speier had spent much of 2007 building support to challenge Lantos in the Democratic primary.

On January 17, 2008, Lantos endorsed Speier as his successor. She also picked up endorsements from Congresswoman Anna Eshoo, Congressman Mike Thompson and San Francisco Mayor Gavin Newsom.

Lantos died on February 11, 2008. Speier won a special primary election on April 8, 2008, to fill the remainder of his term, which ended in January 2009. She won an outright majority, avoiding a runoff that would have been held on June 3, coinciding with the regular primary election. She was elected to a full term in November with 75% of the vote and has been reelected three more times with no substantive opposition.

On July 11, 2008, Speier introduced her first bill, the Gasoline Savings and Speed Limit Reduction Act, which would set a national speed limit of 60 mph in urban areas and 65 mph on less-populated stretches of highway.

In a January 2016 speech on the House floor, Speier announced that she would introduce legislation requiring schools to disclose disciplinary proceedings of faculty.

On August 16, 2017, Speier advocated the use of the 25th Amendment to the U.S. Constitution to remove President Trump from office because of erratic behavior and mental instability "that place the country in great danger", following his response to the Unite the Right rally in Charlottesville, Virginia, and dealings with North Korean dictator Kim Jong-un.

In September 2016, Speier proposed a bill to stop sexual abuse and harassment of women in STEM fields known as the Federal Funding Accountability for Sexual Harassers Act.

On October 27, 2017, Speier, as part of the #MeToo movement, posted a video sharing her experience with sexual harassment on Capitol Hill. She said that when she was in her 20s, Joe Holsinger, a chief of staff for Representative Leo Ryan, "kissed me and stuck his tongue in my mouth." Speier called Congress a breeding ground for hostile work environments and called for more sexual harassment training.

Speier and Representative Bennie Thompson have been seeking to prohibit sleeping in United States Congress offices.

Following the election of Joe Biden as President of the United States, Speier was mentioned as a possible contender for a position in his administration, owing to her experience on national security issues. She indicated she would be willing to serve in a role in the Biden administration, but was not chosen for a position.

As of October 2021, Speier had voted in line with Joe Biden's stated position 100% of the time.

On November 16, 2021, Speier announced she would not run for reelection to Congress in 2022.

Committee assignments 
 Committee on Armed Services
 Subcommittee on Military Personnel, Chair
 Subcommittee on Readiness
 Permanent Select Committee on Intelligence
 Subcommittee on Counterterrorism, Counterintelligence and Counterproliferation
 Subcommittee on Intelligence Modernization and Readiness

Caucuses
 Congressional Asian Pacific American Caucus (Associate Member)
 Congressional Arts Caucus
 U.S.-Japan Caucus

Political views

Defense
Speier has worked to remove cases of sexual assault and serious felonies from the chain of command in the military justice system. She introduced the I am Vanessa Guillén Act, named for Army Spc Vanessa Guillén, on September 16, 2020, and reintroduced it on May 13, 2021. The bill would remove cases of sexual assault and sexual harassment from the chain of command, make sexual harassment a standalone offense in the Uniform Code of Military Justice, and provide a process for compensating servicemembers who survive sexual violence when the military has been negligent. She has been quoted by CNN: "This piece of legislation is going to transform a tragedy into change."

Speier introduced the Vanessa Guillén Military Justice Improvement and Increasing Prevent Act on Jun 23, 2021, which would move the decision to prosecute serious crimes in the military from the chain of command. She has been quoted by NPR: "We're here today for the service members who have spoken out or who have suffered in silence because the message and culture in the military has been clear: Shut up, suck it up and don't rock the boat."

Speier is a critic of the F35 Joint Strike Fighter Program. She has been quoted by CNN: "To continue pouring money into building planes that have ejector seat issues, cyber vulnerabilities, flawed aerodynamics, maintenance problems, an inability to fly at full speed while using weapons, and overheating issues is borderline malfeasance."

Speier co-sponsored the Protecting NATO Skies Act of 2019 to prevent the delivery of F-35s to Turkey after Turkish President Recep Tayyip Erdogan agreed to purchase and deploy Russian S-400 air defense systems.

Abortion
Speier supports legal abortion. When she took the National Political Awareness Test in 2002, she answered, "Abortions should always be legally available." The organization NARAL Pro-Choice America rated Speier as 100% on interest group ratings because she supported the choice of abortion in her voting for legislation. Also in 2008 the Planned Parenthood Organization gave Speier a 100% on her actions regarding abortion. In a February 17, 2011, speech on the House floor, Speier said that she herself had undergone an emergency D&E procedure when complications developed in a wanted pregnancy.

Speier opposed the Trump administration's reinstatement and expansion of the Mexico City Policy, which blocks foreign nongovernmental organizations (NGOs) that receive U.S. health aid from providing referrals for abortion services with their own funding. Research shows that by limiting access to care, this policy has previously led to a 14% decrease in contraceptive use, 12% increase in pregnancies, and 40% increase in abortion rates. She is a cosponsor of H.R. 1055, the Global HER Act, to permanently repeal the Global Gag Rule.

Speier opposed the 2022 overturning of Roe v. Wade, calling the decision "government mandated pregnancy."

Gun laws
Speier believes in stricter gun control. According to her answers on the NPAT (National Political Awareness Test) she would like to require safety locks on all guns and background checks on prospective buyers as well as ban certain guns (other than for hunting) and strengthen state restrictions on buying and owning guns. Gun Owners of America gave her an "F" grade and the Brady Campaign to Prevent Gun Violence and the Jack Berman Advocacy Center gave her a 100% rating. The National Rifle Association (NRA) and Gun Owners of California also gave Speier a low grade on gun rights.

Environment and energy 
Speier is concerned for the protection of the environment. She lists the decline of salmon on the West Coast as evidence of global warming. Speier believes global warming poses a growing danger and negatively affects the environment. When she spoke to the House on the subject, she expressed a desire "to craft a bipartisan and commonsense energy plan that makes polluters pay, provides for middle-class energy tax credits, and creates a new industry and lots of good, clean, green jobs". Speier worked to improve energy legislation with the Clean Air Rebate Act of 2009, the Home Star Act and the American Clean Energy and Security Act.

Foreign policy 
In January 2019, Speier introduced H.R. 1028, the RIGHT Act, to prevent foreign money from influencing U.S. elections. She also introduced the PUTIN Act in 2017, legislation to prevent any federal funding for a cybersecurity unit with Russia, as proposed by then President Donald Trump.

On June 27, 2019, Speier introduced a resolution condemning the murder of journalist Jamal Khashoggi and demanding a reevaluation of the U.S. relationship with Saudi Arabia from the secretary of state in response to reports of numerous violations of the human rights of Saudi activists.

Human rights 
Speier formed the bipartisan Congressional Unexploded Ordnance/Demining Caucus in 2018 to address unexploded ordnance and mines from the U.S. and other countries throughout the world that impact post-conflict economic and social development.

Speier led the successful effort to secure funding in the FY 2020 House-passed appropriations bill for humanitarian demining assistance and ensured that unclassified Department of Defense demining research would be shared with humanitarian demining organizations.

In September 2017, as co-chair of the Ahmadiyya Caucus, Speier condemned the human rights abuses perpetrated against the Rohingya Muslims in Myanmar and supported assistance programs that help partner nations build accountable, transparent governance structures.

Speier opposed the Trump administration's unilateral cuts to the UN Population Fund (UNFPA), which works in more than 150 countries to end preventable maternal deaths, provide voluntary family planning, combat gender-based violence such as child marriage, and train health care workers. She led a letter with 145 of her colleagues urging the administration to reverse its decision to withhold U.S. funding.

Speier also supports efforts to educate girls worldwide, eradicate gender-based violence, promote women's participation in peace and security efforts, and ensure their access to jobs and an economic marketplace free from discrimination.

As co-chair of the bipartisan Congressional Armenian Caucus and an Armenian American, Speier works to build close U.S.-Armenia cooperation with Armenian American groups, the State Department, USAID, and the Armenian government. That includes her amendment that passed the House to provide more than $40 million to Armenian Democracy Assistance and establish direct flights between California and Yerevan.

LGBT equality
Speier supports same-sex marriage. She was a member of the Congressional LGBTQ+ Equality Caucus.

Personal Life
Speier is Roman Catholic.

Electoral history

Books
 This Is Not the Life I Ordered: 50 Ways to Keep Your Head Above Water When Life Keeps Dragging You Down, by Deborah Collins Stephens, Michealene Cristini Risley, Jackie Speier, and Jan Yanehiro, 2007, 
 Undaunted: Surviving Jonestown, Summoning Courage, and Fighting Back, by Jackie Speier, 2018,

See also
 Women in the United States House of Representatives

References

External links

 

 
Articles
 Jackie Speier and Deborah Stephens Stanford Entrepreneurial Thought Leaders seminar mp3.
 
 
 Commencement Speaker, San Francisco State University, 2006
 Senator Jackie Speier one of honored guests at banquet, Armenian National Committee of America Western Region, October 2006.
 
 Join California Jackie Speier

|-

|-

1950 births
20th-century American lawyers
20th-century American politicians
20th-century American women lawyers
20th-century American women politicians
21st-century American politicians
21st-century American women politicians
American people of Armenian descent
American people of German descent
American people of German-Jewish descent
American Roman Catholics
American shooting survivors
Catholics from California
County supervisors in California
Democratic Party California state senators
Democratic Party members of the California State Assembly
Democratic Party members of the United States House of Representatives from California
Equal Rights Amendment
Ethnic Armenian politicians
Female members of the United States House of Representatives
Jewish American people in California politics
Lawyers from San Francisco
Leo Ryan
Living people
People from San Mateo County, California
Peoples Temple
Politicians from San Francisco
United States congressional aides
University of California, Davis alumni
University of California, Hastings College of the Law alumni
Women state legislators in California